Colanguil or Colangüil is a peak in Argentina with an elevation of  metres, the highest at Sierra de Colanguil. Its territory is within the Argentinean protection areas of Provincial Reserve San Guillermo, located within the territory of the Argentinean province of San Juan, city of Iglesia.

First Ascent 

Colanguil was first climbed by Pedro Rosell (Argentina) and Humberto Campodónico (Argentina) 15 December 1994.

Elevation 
Other data from available digital elevation models: SRTM yields 6100 metres, ASTER 6076 metres, ALOS 6076 metres and TanDEM-X 6133 metres. The height of the nearest key col is 4575 meters, leading to a topographic prominence of 1547 meters. Colanguil is considered a Mountain Range according to the Dominance System  and its dominance is 25.27%. Its parent peak is Majadita and the Topographic isolation is 97.8 kilometers.

References

External links 

 Elevation information about Colanguil
 Weather Forecast at Colanguil

Six-thousanders of the Andes
Mountains of Argentina